Bassa may refer to:

People

 Bassa people (Cameroon)
 Basaa language, a member of the Bantu languages family
 Bassa people (Liberia)
 Bassa language, a member of the Kru languages family
 Bassa script

Places
Bassa, Chamba, village in India
 Bassa, Kogi State, Nigeria
 Bassa, Plateau State, Nigeria
 Bassa Cove colony, now Buchanan, Liberia
 al-Bassa, a destroyed Palestinian village, currently located in northern Israel
 Cahora Bassa, an artificial lake in Mozambique
 Grand Bassa County, Liberia
 Another name for Basse Santa Su, Gambia

Other uses
 Business Analysis Summit South Africa, a conference run by the South African Chapter of the International Institute of Business Analysis
 British Airlines Stewards and Stewardesses Association, a union exclusively for British Airways cabin crew
 Bassa Sports Club, an association football team in Antigua and Barbuda

See also
 Basa (disambiguation)

Language and nationality disambiguation pages